AMP Business was an early morning business program hosted by Nadine Chalmers-Ross airing on TV One in New Zealand. The show was followed by Breakfast.

From 1997 to 2007 the programme was hosted and co-produced by Michael Wilson. During this time it was called Telstra Business, TelstraSaturn Business, TelstraClear Business, Business and ASB Business. Wilson went to TV3 in October 2007. allegedly because he was unhappy with network executives changing the time from 6.30-7.00 to 6.00-6.30. He allegedly claimed he would not to be able to get good interviewees and that the decision was made by American consultants without his input. The show was called Breakfast Business until NZI gave their name to the relaunched show. In 2011 the show was sponsored by AMP and was called AMP Business. In early 2012 it was announced that the show will not return in 2012 and that Nadine Charlmes-Ross would just present business updates throughout the breakfast morning show on TV One.

Reporters and Back-up presenters
Lisa Davies back up AMP presenter

1990s New Zealand television series
2000s New Zealand television series
2010s New Zealand television series
1997 New Zealand television series debuts
2012 New Zealand television series endings
Breakfast television in New Zealand
New Zealand television news shows
TVNZ 1 original programming